"Boca" is the ninth episode of the HBO television series The Sopranos. It was written by Jason Cahill, Robin Green and Mitchell Burgess, directed by Andy Wolk and originally aired on March 7, 1999.

Starring
 James Gandolfini as Tony Soprano
 Lorraine Bracco as Dr. Jennifer Melfi
 Edie Falco as Carmela Soprano
 Michael Imperioli as Christopher Moltisanti
 Dominic Chianese as Corrado Soprano, Jr.
 Vincent Pastore as Pussy Bonpensiero *
 Steven Van Zandt as Silvio Dante
 Tony Sirico as Paulie Gualtieri
 Robert Iler as Anthony Soprano, Jr.
 Jamie-Lynn Sigler as Meadow Soprano
 Nancy Marchand as Livia Soprano

* = credit only

Guest starring
 John Ventimiglia as Artie Bucco
 John Heard as Vin Makazian
 Kathrine Narducci as Charmaine Bucco

Also guest starring

Synopsis
Junior goes to Boca Raton, Florida, taking along his long-time girlfriend Bobbi Sanfillipo. In bed, she playfully tells him, "When you kiss me down there, you're like a great artist." He stresses that she must never speak about this to anyone, and reluctantly explains that his associates "think if you suck pussy ... it's a sign of weakness." But Bobbi has already spoken about her sex life with a woman at her nail salon. Word reaches Carmela, who goes to the same nail salon, and she tells Tony. While playing golf with Junior, Tony makes vulgar, oblique jokes about it. Junior understands and begins to think of killing him. Enraged, he fires Bobbi from her job and breaks up with her.

Tony, Silvio, and Artie invite Meadow's soccer coach, Don Hauser, to have drinks at the Bada Bing after a victory. They all have daughters on the team and are enthusiastic supporters. When they read in the newspaper that Hauser is moving to another coaching job, they try to convince him to stay. Paulie delivers a 50-inch television to Hauser's house and insists he take it. Christopher keeps the coach's dog captive in his car and then, as "an animal lover," returns it.

Tony tells Meadow he thinks the coach is going to change his mind about leaving. She appears to be ungrateful and upset. When he remonstrates, she tells him that Hauser is having sex with one of the girls. Tony resolves that Hauser will never do that again. Dr. Melfi asks him, "Why do you think punishing this man falls on you?" Artie tries to show him that he is not acting for justice, only for vengeance, for his own satisfaction. Tony throws Artie out, but stays alone drinking, wondering what to do. Later that evening, Hauser is arrested. Tony goes home, staggering drunk. He tells Carmela he "didn't hurt nobody" as Meadow watches from the staircase.

First appearance
Harold Melvoin: Corrado "Junior" Soprano's lawyer.

Title reference
 Junior goes to Boca Raton, Florida, with his girlfriend Bobbi Sanfillipo.
 The word "boca" in Spanish or "bocca" in Italian means "mouth". This may be a reference to Junior performing oral sex on Bobbi, as well as several secrets being revealed by several characters throughout the episode.

Production
 This episode wrongly reports the location of the University of Rhode Island (URI), claiming that it is in Providence when, in fact, it is in Kingston on the other side of the state. While URI has a satellite campus (the Feinstein Campus) in Providence, URI's sports teams play in Kingston.
 Actor Steven Van Zandt wore his own golfing hat for a scene in which Silvio plays a round of golf.
 The Roxbury High School Girls' Soccer team (Succasunna, New Jersey) played the extras for both the opposing team and members of Meadow's team.  The team used this opportunity as a fundraiser.

Other cultural or historical references
 Junior mentions the "Escobedo brothers" to Mikey Palmice when explaining how it is possible for a psychiatrist to testify against a patient. This is a reference to the Menendez Brothers in Beverly Hills, who killed their parents and were later turned in to the police by their psychologist, L. Jerome Oziel. Also a possible reference to Escobedo v. Illinois, 378 U.S. 478 (1964), the United States Supreme Court case holding that criminal suspects have a right to counsel during police interrogations under the Sixth Amendment.
 Junior hitting Bobbi in her face with a pie when they break up was used as an homage to The Public Enemy, where the main character does the same to his girlfriend with a cut-in-half grapefruit when he says he is leaving her. David Chase has cited The Public Enemy as an enormous influence.
 Over dinner, while discussing Ally's suicide attempt, Tony, under influence of what Dr. Melfi told him previously how self-inflicted shallow cuts to the wrists are actually a cry for help, says how she didn't really want to kill herself:  "It wasn't like frigging Cobain, it was just a little suicidal gesture." He was referring to the iconic rock musician Kurt Cobain, troubled lead singer of Seattle grunge band Nirvana, who committed suicide with a shotgun at the age of 27.

Music
 When Junior is dancing with his girlfriend in Boca, the Spanish song played is "Frente a Frente" written by Mexican singer Juan Gabriel and sung by Spanish singer Rocío Dúrcal. This song is also played again when Corrado Soprano breaks up with her.
 In an early scene, Meadow and her friend are watching the Morphine video for "Buena", and the song, "Dawna", is also played at the end of the episode as Tony Soprano lies on the floor, and through the rolling of the end credits. 
 When Coach Hauser visits the Bada Bing with Silvio Dante, the song played in the bar is "Can't You Feel the Fire" from Steven Van Zandt's album Freedom – No Compromise.
 The song played when Charmaine confronts Artie in the basement about Tony's attempted bribing of Coach Hauser is "Little Joe" by The Spaniels. 
 The song Tony sings when he taunts Junior while they play golf is "South of the Border (Down Mexico Way)". 
 When Tony ponders what to do with Coach Hauser in his office, the song in the background is "Woke Up This Morning (Urban Takeover Mix)" by Alabama 3, who also perform the song's Chosen One Mix in the opening credits.
 The song played when Tony comes home drunk and singing to himself is "There Was a Time".

Filming locations 
Listed in order of first appearance:

 Jersey City and Harsimus Cemetery in Jersey City, New Jersey
 Henry B. Whitehorne Middle School in Verona, New Jersey
 Satin Dolls in Lodi, New Jersey
 West Orange, New Jersey
 Lincoln Park, New Jersey
 Jersey City, New Jersey
 West Caldwell, New Jersey
 Bloomfield, New Jersey

References

External links
"Boca"  at HBO

The Sopranos (season 1) episodes
1999 American television episodes

fr:Révélations intimes (Les Soprano)